Captain January is an 1891 children's novel, written by  Laura E. Richards. It was later adapted into two films, the 1924 silent film Captain January, starring Baby Peggy and the 1936 musical film Captain January, starring Shirley Temple. The story is about a lighthouse keeper and his little girl, Star.

Editions
Boston, Estes & Lauriat, 1891, 1893, 1897
Boston, D. Estes & company [1902]
New York, Random House [1959] (combined ed. with The Little Colonel by Annie Fellows Johnston)
Anthologized in The Shirley Temple Treasury (Random, 1959) with The Little Colonel, Rebecca of Sunnybrook Farm and Heidi.

References

External links
Online text at Project Gutenberg

1891 American novels
American children's novels
American novels adapted into films
1890s children's books
Works set in lighthouses